The 1899–1900 season was Burslem Port Vale's second consecutive season (sixth overall) of football in the English Football League. Another season of charging to the summit of the Second Division table, only to fall into mid-table obscurity, this time the club suffered from low support and subsequently poor finances. Once again the team maintained a decent defensive record, only to fail miserably in front of goal – the second lowest total in the league.

Overview

Second Division
During the pre-season, the Athletic Ground had its capacity increased to 25,000. Last season's top scorers Dick Evans and James Peake departed for Reading and Millwall Athletic respectively; also star player Tommy Clare retired. Four new forwards were signed, namely Scots Billy Grassam (Maryhill) and James Reid (Hibernian), and local lads Charles Walters (Gainsborough Trinity) and Billy Leech (Tottenham Hotspur).

The season started with four defeats in the first six games in a dismal September. They turned their form around with a six game win streak that gave them a 100% win record in October and November. However one win in the next thirteen games followed, as the club slipped back down the league. Their decline was helped by the regular selling of key players in order to balance the books.

Finances
Attendance figures made grim reading, and left-half Ted McDonald had to be sold to Notts County in November in order to raise cash. Goalkeeper Herbert Birchenough was sold to Glossop in January, with top scorer Howard Harvey also sold to Manchester City that same month. Their second to last match saw a mere 300 supporters turn up to watch. At the end of the season there were drastic budget cuts, even so much as to stop paying players wages over the summer period – the only club in the league to do so. Cheaper, local talent was recruited to fill the void left by departing stars. The club lost £73 over the course of the campaign, despite having trimmed ten times that figure from the playing budget.

Cup competitions
In the FA Cup, the club vanquished nearby Nantwich and Crewe Alexandra, but failed to make it to the First Round Proper. They reached the final of the Staffordshire Senior Cup and the Birmingham Senior Cup, losing to West Bromwich Albion and Wolverhampton Wanderers respectively. West Brom defeated Vale 5–0 in the final at Villa Park, taking revenge for the "Valeites" dumping West Brom out of the Birmingham Cup by the same scoreline.

League table

Results

Burslem Port Vale's score comes first

Football League Second Division

Results by matchday

Matches

FA Cup

Birmingham Senior Cup

Staffordshire Senior Cup

Player statistics

Appearances

Top scorers

Transfers

Transfers in

Transfers out

References
Specific

General

Port Vale F.C. seasons
Burslem Port Vale